Alan Gertner (born 1984) is a Canadian. He is the co-founder and CEO of Tokyo Smoke, a Canadian lifestyle brand that focuses on coffee, clothing and legal cannabis. Gertner who also co-founded Hiku, a Canadian company, is a former Google executive  known for his work in the Canadian cannabis industry.

Early life

Gertner was born in Toronto, Ontario and raised in the Forest Hill neighbourhood by his parents. His father Lorne Gertner is a lifelong entrepreneur who managed a women's apparel manufacturer Mister Leonard.  Gertner received a degree in management and business administration from the University of Western Ontario Ivey Business School.

Career 
From 2009 to 2014, Gertner held several executive positions at Google's Mountain View, California and Google Asia Singapore offices. During this tenure, he was a founding member of Google's first Global Business Strategy team in Mountain View, California. In 2015, the company sent him to Ghana to help build an infrastructure for high-speed Internet. During this project, and while on his way to a "voodoo" ceremony in rural Ghana, Gertner had a life-changing conversation with a tour guide who told him: "You either work on something you love, or work because it supports the people you love." This encounter was a defining moment in his career that made him quit his job at Google, take a break and later start Tokyo Smoke in partnership with his father.  Gertner now lives in Toronto and is mainly involved in the cannabis industry.

Gertner, a former Google employee, is currently involved in Tokyo Smoke, a retail operation and brand he co-founded in 2015 with his father Lorne Gertner. Gertner (the father) is considered the Godfather of Canadian cannabis and is also the CEO of Hill and Gertner Capital Corp., a Toronto-based merchant bank. Tokyo Smoke has a downtown Toronto coffee shop and store that sells pot paraphernalia and accessories.  He is one of the handful entrepreneurs and investors who left lucrative corporate jobs in technology and finance to focus on startups in the marijuana industry. Gertner has expanded the Tokyo Smoke brand locally and internationally with eight stores.

Gertner raised $10 million in capital and led the company's merger with Cannabis Company Limited known as DOJA Cannabis in December 2017. The combined company known as Hiku Brands Company Ltd. is headed by Gertner and houses the cannabis brands of DOJA, Tokyo Smoke, and Van der Pop.

References

External links
  Alan Gertner
  Tokyo Smoke

Living people
1984 births
Businesspeople from Toronto
University of Western Ontario alumni
Businesspeople in the cannabis industry